Soledad Etla is a town and municipality in Oaxaca in south-western Mexico. The municipality covers an area of  km². 
It is part of the Etla District in the Valles Centrales region.

References

Municipalities of Oaxaca